Anastas Kristo (born 5 July 1985) is an Albanian footballer, who most recently played for Adelaide Olympic.

Club career
Kristo, an Albanian with Italian citizenship is a former Maltese Premier League and Italian Serie C Scottish First Division professional player. He arrived in Australia in February 2010 and soon after signed a professional playing contract with the Dandenong Thunder for the 2010 season. In 2011 he joined Victorian Premier League team Moreland Zebras.

References

1975 births
Living people
20th-century Albanian sportspeople
21st-century Albanian sportspeople
Albanian footballers
Association football midfielders
Frosinone Calcio players
Lija Athletic F.C. players
Hamilton Academical F.C. players
Dandenong Thunder SC players
Moreland Zebras FC players
Albanian expatriate footballers
Expatriate footballers in Italy
Albanian expatriate sportspeople in Italy
Expatriate footballers in Malta
Albanian expatriate sportspeople in Malta
Expatriate footballers in Germany
Albanian expatriate sportspeople in Germany
Expatriate footballers in Scotland
Albanian expatriate sportspeople in Scotland
Expatriate soccer players in Australia
Albanian expatriate sportspeople in Australia
TSV Rain am Lech players